The 1969–70 Connecticut Huskies men's basketball team represented the University of Connecticut in the 1969–70 collegiate men's basketball season. The Huskies completed the season with a 14–9 overall record. The Huskies were members of the Yankee Conference, where they ended the season with an 8–2 record. They were the Yankee Conference Regular Season Champions. The Huskies played their home games at Hugh S. Greer Field House in Storrs, Connecticut, and were led by first-year head coach Dee Rowe.

Schedule 

|-
!colspan=12 style=""| Regular Season

Schedule Source:

References 

UConn Huskies men's basketball seasons
Connecticut
Connecticut Huskies men's basketball team
Connecticut Huskies men's basketball team